Attila is the debut novel by Swedish author Klas Östergren. It was published in 1975.

References

External links

1975 Swedish novels
Novels by Klas Östergren
Swedish-language novels
Novels set in Stockholm
1975 debut novels
Albert Bonniers Förlag books